Anna Ksok (born 29 September 1983 in Wrocław) is a retired Polish athlete specialising in the high jump. She won the silver at the 2003 Summer Universiade.

Her personal best jump is 1.94 metres, both indoors and outdoors.

Competition record

References

1983 births
Living people
Polish female high jumpers
Universiade medalists in athletics (track and field)
Sportspeople from Wrocław
Universiade silver medalists for Poland
Medalists at the 2003 Summer Universiade